Daniil Alexandrovich Miromanov (born 11 July 1997) is a Russian professional ice hockey defenseman who is currently playing for the  Vegas Golden Knights of the National Hockey League (NHL).

Playing career
Miromanov as a Russian native, played junior hockey in Canada originally as a forward with the Acadie–Bathurst Titan and Moncton Wildcats of the Quebec Major Junior Hockey League (QMJHL). Moving to defense under guidance of Igor Larionov, Miromanov made his professional debut with for HC Sochi of the Kontinental Hockey League (KHL) during the 2017–18 season before returning to complete his major junior career in the QMHJL with the Wildcats.

He has also played professional with Czech club, HC Dynamo Pardubice of the Czech Extraliga (ELH) and the Manchester Monarchs in the ECHL before returning to Russia and eventually resuming his KHL career with Sochi in the 2019–20 season. Miromanov led all Sochi defenseman in scoring appearing in 58 games, collecting 10 goals and 29 points from the blueline. After completing the season, Miromanov was signed as an undrafted free agent to a one-year, entry-level contract with the Vegas Golden Knights on 16 March 2021. He joined the Golden Knights AHL affiliate, the Henderson Silver Knights, for the remainder of the season, registering 2 assists through 5 post-season games in the Pacific Division playoffs.

In his first training camp with the Golden Knights, Miromanov impressed before he was re-assigned to the Silver Knights to begin the  season.  After collecting 4 points through the opening two games with the Silver Knights, Mirmanov was recalled to alleviate injury concerns on the Golden Knights on 21 October 2021. He made his NHL debut with the Golden Knights on 24 October 2021, appearing in a third-pairing role on the blueline in a 2–0 defeat to the New York Islanders. He recorded his first career point in his second career game, collecting an assist in a 3–1 victory over the Colorado Avalanche on 26 October 2021.

Career statistics

References

External links

1997 births
Living people
Acadie–Bathurst Titan players
Dizel Penza players
HC Dynamo Pardubice players
Henderson Silver Knights players
LHK Jestřábi Prostějov players
Manchester Monarchs (ECHL) players
Moncton Wildcats players
SKA-Neva players
HC Sochi players
Undrafted National Hockey League players
Vegas Golden Knights players
Ice hockey people from Moscow
Russian expatriate sportspeople in the United States
Russian expatriate sportspeople in Canada
Russian expatriate sportspeople in the Czech Republic
Expatriate ice hockey players in the United States
Expatriate ice hockey players in the Czech Republic
Expatriate ice hockey players in Canada
Russian expatriate ice hockey people